Eastern Cabaret was a live variety programme series broadcast in 193839 on BBC Television. It was one of several spin-offs from the BBC series Cabaret. Three episodes were broadcast; they were produced by Harry Pringle, and the first two were presented by Cyril Fletcher. The BBC television service was suspended on 1 September 1939 with the outbreak of World War II, and no further episodes were made.

According to Radio Times (20 May 1938), "Harry Pringle, Reginald Smith's officemate, is having a busy time preparing for his Eastern Cabaret, to be given next week on Monday, May 30, and Saturday, June 4. One of his difficulties was getting snakes without temperament and susceptible to the charms of native charmers. He went to five different agencies and gave auditions to thirty-two snakes, and even then failed to find a satisfactory performer". A later entry in Radio Times suggests that this may not have been entirely serious, saying that the background had been "codded" (i.e. parodied) by compere Cyril Fletcher.

No episodes have survived.

Performers 
, the following performers who appeared in Eastern Cabaret are subjects of Wikipedia articles. The numbers of episodes in which they appeared are given in parentheses (treating repeat performances as a single episode).
 Cyril Fletcher (19132005), English compere (2) 
 Wilbur Hall and Renée Fields, American comedy musicians (1) 
 Stanley Holloway (18901982), English comedian (1)

See also 
 Cabaret (British TV series)
 Cabaret Cartoons
 Cabaret Cruise
 Comedy Cabaret
 Intimate Cabaret
 Western Cabaret

Notes

References

1930s British television series
1938 British television series debuts
1939 British television series endings
Lost BBC episodes
BBC Television shows
Black-and-white British television shows
British variety television shows